Luigi Petrillo (18 March 1903 – 18 March 1969) was an Italian modern pentathlete. He competed at the 1928 Summer Olympics.

References

External links
 

1903 births
1969 deaths
Italian male modern pentathletes
Olympic modern pentathletes of Italy
Modern pentathletes at the 1928 Summer Olympics
Sportspeople from Taranto
20th-century Italian people